The 1951 Tulsa Golden Hurricane football team represented the University of Tulsa during the 1951 college football season. In their sixth year under head coach Buddy Brothers, the Golden Hurricane compiled a 9–2 record, 4–0 against conference opponents, and won the Missouri Valley Conference championship. The team's losses were against Cincinnati (47–35) and Arkansas (24–7)

Schedule

References

Tulsa
Tulsa Golden Hurricane football seasons
Missouri Valley Conference football champion seasons
Tulsa Golden Hurricane football